Violet Lucille Fletcher (March 28, 1912August 31, 2000) was an American screenwriter of film, radio and television. Her credits include The Hitch-Hiker, an original radio play written for Orson Welles and adapted for a notable episode of The Twilight Zone television series. Lucille Fletcher also wrote Sorry, Wrong Number, one of the most celebrated plays in the history of American radio, which she adapted and expanded for the 1948 film noir classic of the same name. Married to composer Bernard Herrmann in 1939, she wrote the libretto for his opera Wuthering Heights, which he began in 1943 and completed in 1951, after their divorce.

Biography

Early life
Violet Lucille Fletcher was born March 28, 1912, in Brooklyn, New York. Her parents were Matthew Emerson Fletcher, a marine draftsman for the Standard Ship Company (a subsidiary of the Standard Oil Company of New Jersey), and Violet (Anderson) Fletcher.

After attending Public School 164 and the Maxwell Training School, Fletcher went to Bay Ridge High School and became president of the Arista honor society and editor of the school magazine. At age 17 she was declared the champion student orator at the regional competition of the National Oratorical Contest on the Constitution of the United States, sponsored by The New York Times at The Town Hall May 17, 1929. The only female finalist in the New York zone, Fletcher received an all-expenses paid trip to South America, a gold medal, a cash prize of $1,000 and an opportunity to compete for the national championship. Fletcher placed third in the national competition May 25, 1929, judged by five justices of the United States Supreme Court, with an address titled, "The Constitution: A Guarantee of the Personal Liberty of the Individual."

Fletcher attended Vassar College, where she earned a bachelor of arts degree with honors in 1933.

Career
From 1934 to 1939, Lucille Fletcher worked as a music librarian, copyright clerk and publicity writer at CBS. There she met her future husband, composer Bernard Herrmann, who conducted the CBS orchestra.  The couple dated for five years, but delayed marriage due to her parents' objections. They finally married on October 2, 1939.

Fletcher's first success came when one of her magazine stories, "My Client Curley", was adapted for radio by Norman Corwin. Broadcast on the Columbia Workshop March 7, 1940, it was later adapted for the 1944 Cary Grant film, Once Upon a Time.

Herrmann wrote the score for the November 17, 1941, radio debut of Fletcher's famous story, The Hitch-Hiker on The Orson Welles Show.

Fletcher's greatest success, Sorry, Wrong Number, premiered on May 25, 1943, as an episode of the radio series Suspense. Agnes Moorehead created the role in the first performance and again in several later radio productions. It was broadcast nationwide seven times between 1943 and 1948. Fletcher's daughter Dorothy Herrmann told The New York Times that Fletcher got the idea for Sorry, Wrong Number when she was buying food for her sick child at a local grocery on Manhattan's East Side, and a well-dressed woman with an obnoxious manner refused to allow Fletcher to go ahead of her in line. Herrmann described the drama as an "act of revenge".

Barbara Stanwyck starred in the 1948 film version of Sorry, Wrong Number. A 1959 version produced for the CBS radio series Suspense received a 1960 Edgar Award for Best Radio Drama. Two operas were based on the play, which Orson Welles called "the greatest single radio script ever written".

Fletcher adapted the first part of the Emily Brontë novel Wuthering Heights into a libretto for Bernard Herrmann's opera of the same name, conceived in 1943. He completed the opera in June 1951, by which time they had divorced. Fletcher said the opera was "perhaps the closest to his talent and heart." The work was never produced on stage during Herrmann's lifetime.

Fletcher is interviewed in the 1992 documentary, Music for the Movies: Bernard Herrmann, which was nominated for an Academy Award.

Personal life
Lucille Fletcher and Bernard Herrmann had two daughters, Wendy and Dorothy. The couple divorced in 1948, over his affair with her cousin Kathy Lucille (Lucy) Anderson. Anderson and Herrmann were married the following year.

Fletcher married Douglass Wallop, a writer, on January 6, 1949. They remained married until his death in 1985.

Lucille Fletcher died on August 31, 2000, after suffering a stroke.

Works

Radio plays
My Client Curly. WHP-CBS, March 7, 1940
The Man with the One Track Mind. Columbia Workshop, June 30, 1940.
Carmilla. Columbia Workshop, July 28, 1940.
Alf, The All-American Fly. Columbia Workshop, September 1, 1940.
The Hitch-Hiker. The Orson Welles Show, November 17, 1941.
Someone Else. Columbia Workshop, July 20, 1942.
Remodeled Brownstone. Columbia Workshop, October 19, 1942.
Gremlins. Ceiling Unlimited, December 21, 1942.
The Diary of Saphronia Winters. Suspense, April 27, 1943.
Sorry, Wrong Number. Suspense, May 25, 1943.
Fugue in C Minor. Suspense, June 1, 1944.
The Search for Henri Le Fevre. Suspense, July 6, 1944.
 Night Man. Suspense, October 26, 1944.
The Furnished Floor. Suspense, September 13, 1945.
Dark Journey. Suspense, April 25, 1946.
The Thing in the Window. Suspense, December 19, 1946.
Bela Boczniak's Bad Dreams. The Clock, April 25, 1948.

Novels
Sorry, Wrong Number: A Novelization, with Allan Ullman. New York: Random House, 1948. OCLC 2312888
Night Man, with Allan Ullman. New York: Random House, 1951. OCLC 1387009
The Daughters of Jasper Clay. New York: Holt, 1958.  OCLC 1442341
Blindfold. New York: Random House, 1960. OCLC 1807238
And Presumed Dead. New York: Random House, 1963. OCLC 1439426
The Strange Blue Yawl. New York: Random House, 1964. OCLC 1416360
The Girl in Cabin B54. New York: Random House, 1968. 
Night Watch. New York: Random House, 1972. 
Eighty Dollars to Stamford. New York: Random House, 1975. 
Mirror Image. New York: W. Morrow and Co, 1988.

Plays
Sorry, Wrong Number, and The Hitch-Hiker; Plays in One Act. [New York]: Dramatists Play Service, 1952. 
Night Watch; A Play of Suspense in Two Acts. [New York]: Dramatists Play Service, 1972.

Librettos
Wuthering Heights; Opera in 4 Acts and a Prologue, with Bernard Herrmann. London: Novello, 1965. OCLC 13572509

Awards
Sorry, Wrong Number received the Edgar Allan Poe Award from the Mystery Writers of America.

References

External links

 
 Obituary, The New York Times, September 6, 2000

 Suspense: Diary of Saphronia Winters
Suspense: Fugue in C Minor
Suspense: The Hitchhiker
Suspense: Sorry, Wrong Number
 Suspense: The Thing in the Window

1912 births
2000 deaths
American radio writers
Women radio writers
Screenwriters from New York (state)
Edgar Award winners
Writers from Brooklyn
Vassar College alumni
American women screenwriters
Novelists from Pennsylvania
20th-century American women writers
American opera librettists
Women opera librettists
American women novelists
American women dramatists and playwrights
20th-century American novelists
20th-century American dramatists and playwrights
Novelists from New York (state)
Screenwriters from Pennsylvania
20th-century American screenwriters